The Cessna 175 Skylark is a four-seat, single-engine, high-wing airplane produced by Cessna between 1958 and 1962.

Production history
The 175 was designed to fill a niche between the Cessna 172 and the faster Cessna 182. The engine of the 175, a geared version of the O-300 (Continental GO-300) used in the 172, is rated at 175 hp (130 kW), or 30 hp (22 kW) more than the 172 engine. Between 1958 and 1962, a total of 2,106 were built. The basic airplane was marketed as the 175, and the plane with a package of optional equipment and overall paint (a partial paint scheme was used on the basic model) was marketed as the Skylark.

Design
The airframe of the 175 is all metal, constructed of aluminum alloy. The fuselage is a semi-monocoque structure, with exterior skin sheets riveted to formers and longerons. The strut-braced wings, likewise, are constructed of exterior skin sheets riveted to spars and ribs. The landing gear of the 175 is in a tricycle arrangement, with main gear legs made of spring steel, along with a steerable nosewheel connected through an oleo strut used for shock absorption.

While it incorporates airframe changes to accommodate an increased gross weight, the 175 is similar in appearance to the 172 of the same vintage. The most noticeable difference is the distinctive hump in the forward cowling of later series airplanes to accommodate the engine's reduction gear. Although externally identical to the 172, the 175 was built to a different type certificate, although most parts aft of the firewall are interchangeable. The 172XP and T-41B/C/D Mescalero share the 175 type certificate.

The GO-300 engine
An unusual feature of the 175 is the geared Continental GO-300 engine. Whereas most single-engine airplanes use direct drive, this engine drives the propeller through a reducing gearbox, so the engine runs at 3200 rpm to turn the propeller at 2400 rpm (4:3). The GO-300 engine suffered reliability problems and helped give the 175 a poor reputation. Some Skylarks flying today have been converted to larger-displacement direct-drive engines though almost 90% still retain the GO-300.

The GO-300's tainted reputation is largely undeserved, since its problems were the result of pilots who were unfamiliar with gear reduction engines, simply not operating the engine at the higher RPMs specified in the C-175 Pilot's Operating Handbook. Pilots unfamiliar with the engine often operate the engine at the low RPM settings (2300–2700) appropriate to direct-drive engines, while the 175's Operating Handbook calls for cruising at 2900 RPM. The low RPM causes harmonic vibration in the reduction gear between the quill shaft (that turned the propeller) and crankshaft, and the low power results in low airspeeds that prevents the engine's air-cooling system from operating effectively, resulting in chronic reliability problems for engines not operated at the recommended power settings.

Variants
Many of the higher-powered versions of the 172 in fact belong to the 175 type design, such as the P172D Powermatic; the military T-41B, -C, and -D; the R172J and R172K Hawk XP; and the retractable-gear 172RG.
175 Skylark
Powered by the  Continental GO-300A or -300C engine, gross weight , certified 14 January 1958
175A Skylark
Powered by the  Continental GO-300C or -300D engine, landplane gross weight , seaplane gross weight , certified 28 August 1959
175B Skylark
Powered by the  Continental GO-300C or -300D engine, landplane gross weight , seaplane gross weight , certified 14 June 1960
175C Skylark
Powered by the  Continental GO-300E, gross weight , certified 18 September 1961, with a constant-speed propeller standard. Base price $14,125
P172D Powermatic Skyhawk
Powered by the  Continental GO-300E and a cruise speed  faster than the standard 172D. In reality this was not a new model, but a 175 Skylark that had been renamed for its last year of production. The Skylark had gained a reputation for poor engine reliability, and the renaming of it as a 172 was a marketing attempt to regain sales through rebranding. The move was not a success, and neither the 1963 Powermatic nor the Skylark were produced again after the 1963 model year.

Specifications (Cessna 175C)

See also

References

External links

175
High-wing aircraft
Single-engined tractor aircraft
1950s United States civil utility aircraft
Aircraft first flown in 1958